Adrien Deschryver ( — ) was a Belgian photographer and conservationist, who established and was chief warden of the Kahuzi-Biega National Park near the western bank of Lake Kivu and the Rwandan border in 1970, and acted as a one-man force for law and order within the park during a civil war around Bukavu.

Work in Africa

Early work with Gorillas 
In the 1960s, Deschryver and Dian Fossey gained much prominence in their approach of two subspecies of gorillas in Rwanda and the Democratic Republic of the Congo. The former had started approaching gorillas during the mid-1960s for tourism, accompanied by two trackers of the Pygmy tribe, Pili Pili Purusi and Mishebere Patrice.

Creation and work in the Kahuzi-Biega National Park 
In 1970, Deschryver convinced the recently created congolese administration of the urgent need for an extended protected natural reserve in the region, the hunting of gorillas having brought their population at a critical level. This led to the creation the same year of the Kahuzi-Biega National Park.

Today, Deschryver might be best recognized from a sequence out of the 1974 documentary Gorilla, which shows him bringing an abandoned baby gorilla into the forest to help it adjust to its natural habitat. The baby gorilla begins to scream when it hears other gorillas and is subsequently snatched from Deschryver by the dominant silverback. The silverback attempts to either attack or intimidate Deschryver, but ultimately backs away when Deschryver refuses to move or flinch. The clip of Deschryver resisting the silverback's charge has since gone viral, with memes concerning Deschryver's courageousness. Others have noted that the clip is an excellent demonstration of how someone's demeanor and fearlessness establishes dominance oversize and strength.

Deschryver died brutally in "dubious circumstances [...] perhaps poisoned" and is buried at the Tshivanga headquarters.

References

External links

Lake Kivu
Bukavu
1939 births
1989 deaths